Mal, which in Spanish means bad or evil, may also refer to:

Places
Malo, Italy, a town
Malo Island, formerly known as St. Bartholomew, Vanuatu
Malo (Solomon Islands), an island
Malo, Washington, Ferry County, Washington, United States
Malo-les-Bains, now part of Dunkirk, France

People
David Malo (born c. 1793) Native Hawaiian historian
Luc Malo (born 1973), Canadian politician
Malo, hero-god of Torres Strait Islander people
Malo', a French singer
Malo (saint) (born c. 520), 6th century saint, founder and namesake of the Breton city
María Fernanda Malo (born 1985), Mexican actress
Raul Malo (born 1965), American musician & producer
Vincent Malo (ca. 1595 - 1649), a Flemish painter

Other
Malo (band), American Latin-tinged rock and roll group
 Malo (album), a 1972 album by the band
 Malo (song), a song by Anuel AA, Zion and Randy 
"Malo", a song by Bebe, from the album Pafuera Telarañas
Malo (jellyfish), a genus of box jellyfish
Malo, a loincloth 
Malo language (disambiguation)
Malo (character), fictional character in game The Legend of Zelda: Twilight Princess
Malo de Vigny, a fictional character in the game Amnesia: The Dark Descent
Malo (company), an Italian brand of cashmere
Government of Samoa

See also
 Saint Malo (disambiguation)
 O le Ao o le Malo is the official title of Samoa's head of state
 Los Hombres Malo is an album by the band Outlaws